"Lights and Thunder" is a song by American/Danish glam metal band White Lion and was released as a single in the UK from their 1991 album Mane Attraction. The song charted at No. 95 in the UK.

Background
"Lights and Thunder" was White Lion's longest song, from 1991–2008, an eight-minute heavy rock epic with a complex structure inspired by Led Zeppelin’s Achilles Last Stand. In 2008, "Sangre de Cristo", from Return of the Pride became the bands longest song, with a length of eight minutes and forty-four seconds. The song was one of many songs from the band that addressed social or political issues.

Music video
In 2005 for the White Lion live album "Rocking the USA" a music video was made for the live version of the song which features on the White Lion DVD Bang Your Head Festival 2005.

Track listing
7" single
"Lights and Thunder" - 4:56
"She's Got Everything" - 5:56

12" maxi-single
"Lights and Thunder" (edit)
"Fight to Survive" (live)
"She's Got Everything"

Personnel
Mike Tramp - lead vocals
Vito Bratta - lead guitar
James Lomenzo - bass guitar
Greg D'Angelo - drums

Charts

References

White Lion songs
1991 songs
1991 singles
Song recordings produced by Richie Zito
Songs written by Vito Bratta
Songs written by Mike Tramp
Atlantic Records singles